White Earth is a census-designated place (CDP) in Becker County, Minnesota, United States. The population was 580 at the 2010 census.

White Earth was named after the White Earth Indian Reservation, and that took its name from the White Earth Lake.

Geography

Demographics

2000
As of the census of 2000, there were 424 people, 154 households, and 83 families residing in the CDP. The racial makeup of the CDP was 3.54% White, 93.63% Native American, and 2.83% from two or more races. Hispanic or Latino of any race were 2.12% of the population.

There were 154 households, out of which 32.5% had children under the age of 18 living with them, 16.9% were married couples living together, 26.6% had a female householder with no husband present, and 45.5% were non-families. 39.6% of all households were made up of individuals, and 16.2% had someone living alone who was 65 years of age or older. The average household size was 2.75 and the average family size was 3.79.

In the CDP, the population was spread out, with 38.9% under the age of 18, 11.1% from 18 to 24, 20.0% from 25 to 44, 21.0% from 45 to 64, and 9.0% who were 65 years of age or older. The median age was 25 years. For every 100 females, there were 100.0 males. For every 100 females age 18 and over, there were 97.7 males.

The median income for a household in the CDP was $12,361, and the median income for a family was $15,469. Males had a median income of $20,000 versus $19,375 for females. The per capita income for the CDP was $6,982. About 41.5% of families and 45.8% of the population were below the poverty line, including 51.1% of those under age 18 and 22.2% of those age 65 or over.

Notable people
Joe Guyon, Star Athlete, Inducted into both the College and Pro Football Halls of Fame.
Chip Wadena, Tribal Chairman of the White Earth Reservation, was born in White Earth.

References

Census-designated places in Becker County, Minnesota
Census-designated places in Minnesota